Battle River was a federal electoral district in Alberta, Canada, that was represented in the House of Commons of Canada at various times from 1914 to 2005.

This riding was created in 1914 from parts of Strathcona and Victoria ridings. It was abolished in 1952 when it was redistributed into Acadia, Battle River—Camrose, Red Deer and Vegreville ridings.

In 1966, it was recreated from parts of Acadia and Battle River—Camrose ridings. It was abolished again in 1976 when it was redistributed into Crowfoot, Red Deer, Vegreville and Wetaskiwin ridings.

The riding has existed several times:

 from 1914 – 1952
 from 1966 – 1976
 from 2004 – 2005

In 2004, Westlock—St. Paul riding was renamed "Battle River", but the name was changed back to "Westlock—St. Paul" before an election was held.

Election results

1914-1952

1966-1976

See also 

 List of Canadian federal electoral districts
 Past Canadian electoral districts

External links 
 
 

Former federal electoral districts of Alberta